Ulefos Jernværk is an iron foundry located at Ulefoss in the municipality Nome, Norway. It was established in 1657 by Ove Gjedde and Preben von Ahnen. The company produced pig iron until 1877. Wood-burning stoves were important products until the 1950s. From 1999 the foundry is owned by the holding company Ulefos NV.

Further reading

References

1657 establishments in Norway
Companies based in Telemark
Iron and steel mills
Metal companies of Norway